The Fender Squier Precision Bass is a bass guitar manufactured by several companies in various countries for Fender.

References

S